Oxaflozane (INN) (brand name Conflictan) is an antidepressant and anxiolytic drug that was introduced by Solvay in France in 1982 for the treatment of depression but has since been discontinued. It is a prodrug of flumexadol (N-dealkyloxaflozane; 2-(3-trifluoromethylphenyl)morpholine; CERM-1841 or 1841-CERM), which is reported to act as an agonist of the serotonin 5-HT1A (pKi = 7.1) and 5-HT2C (pKi = 7.5) receptors and, to a much lesser extent, of the 5-HT2A (pKi = 6.0) receptor. In addition to its serotonergic properties, oxaflozane may also produce anticholinergic side effects at high doses, namely in overdose.

See also
 Fluminorex
 Fludorex
 Fenfluramine
 TFMPP
 Befiradol

References

Further reading
 
 
 
 
 

5-HT1A agonists
5-HT2A agonists
5-HT2C agonists
Abandoned drugs
Antidepressants
Anxiolytics
Phenylmorpholines
Trifluoromethyl compounds
Isopropyl compounds